Mayu Karahashi (born 4 August 1999) is a Japanese professional footballer who plays as a midfielder for WE League club Chifure AS Elfen Saitama.

Club career 
Karahashi made her WE League debut on 20 September 2021.

References 

WE League players
Living people
1999 births
Japanese women's footballers
Women's association football midfielders
Association football people from Niigata Prefecture
Chifure AS Elfen Saitama players